"Keep On Falling" is a song performed by Spanish singer Manel Navarro. The song was released as a digital download on 2 June 2017 by Sony Music Spain. The song peaked at number 37 on the Spanish Singles Chart. A lyric video for the song was uploaded to YouTube on 2 June 2017.

Track listing

Charts

Release history

References

2017 songs
2017 singles